The Music City 200 is a  annual ARCA Menards Series East race held at the Nashville Fairgrounds Speedway in Nashville, Tennessee. The event has been part of the ARCA Menards Series and ARCA Menards Series East (previously the NASCAR Busch and Camping World East Series) schedules and has come and gone from both throughout its history. It was originally held in 1992 in what was then known as the ARCA SuperCar Series, brought back in 2007 and 2008 as an East Series race, brought back in 2015 as an ARCA Racing (later Menards) Series race, and then moved back to the East Series after NASCAR's acquisition of ARCA.

Sammy Smith is the defending winner of this race. He won this race in 2021 and 2022.

History

Chevrolet won the first six races, while Toyota has won the last three. During its first stint on the East Series schedule in 2007 and 2008, the race was 150 laps instead of the 200 laps that it has had in all the other years it has been run.

The race was a late addition to the 2020 ARCA Menards Series East schedule. The rest of the races on the schedule had been announced a month earlier. However, due to the COVID-19 pandemic, the 2020 race ended up being cancelled. It was not rescheduled for another date later in the season. Unlike some of the other cancelled races on the East Series schedule, it was not replaced by another race at a different track.

Crosley Brands became the title sponsor of the race in 2021. They did not return in 2022 and another title sponsor was not found, and as a result, the race went back to the name it has had in the years it has not had a title sponsor, the Music City 200.

Past winners

ARCA Menards Series

ARCA Menards Series East

References

External links
 

1992 establishments in Tennessee
ARCA Menards Series races
Sports in Nashville, Tennessee
ARCA Menards Series East
NASCAR races at Fairgrounds Speedway